Otter Brook may refer to:

 Otter Brook, Nova Scotia, Canada, a community
 Otter Brook (Ashuelot River tributary), New Hampshire, United States, a river